Erythrodiplax basifusca, the plateau dragonlet, is a species of skimmer in the dragonfly family Libellulidae.

The IUCN conservation status of Erythrodiplax basifusca is "LC", least concern, with no immediate threat to the species' survival. The population is stable. The IUCN status was reviewed in 2017.

References

Further reading

 

Libellulidae
Articles created by Qbugbot
Insects described in 1895